Håkon Mjåset Johansen (born 1 August 1975 in Trondheim, Norway) is a Norwegian jazz drummer and composer, known from playing with the Trondheim Jazz Orchestra featuring Chick Corea at Moldejazz 2000, cooperations with Bugge Wesseltoft's New Conceptions of Jazz, Ole Morten Vågan's Motif, Siri Gjære's Cricket Club and the Ola Kvernberg Trio. He has also contributed to releases with Jon Larsen, the Atle Nymo/Frode Nymo Quartet and Jan Garbarek.

Career 

Johansen was educated on the Jazz program at Trondheim Musikkonservatorium, where he and fellow students established the band Urban Connection in 1996 and Come Shine (1999–2003).  He also plays with a series of other bands and participates on many recordings.

With the Håvard Wiik Trio he has performed with Ole Morten Vågan, and at the Oslo Jazz Festival 2006, he played with Jon Gordon in quartet with Roger Arntzen and Asbjørn Lerheim.  He has also been a regular member of Håvard Stubø Quartet.

Honors 
1998: This year's Young Jazz Musicians
2000: 1st Prize in "Avignon Jazz Contest"
2001: "Young Nordic Jazz Comets" in København, with the band "Motif»
2001: "Spellemannsprisen" for the album Urban Connection, with "Urban Connection»
2002: "Spellemannsprisen" for the album Do do that voodoo, with "Come Shine»
2013: Kongsberg Jazz Award

Discography (in selection) 

With Come Shine
2000: Come Shine (Curling Legs)
2002: Do do that voodoo (Curling Legs), awarded Spellemannprisen 2002
2003: In concert (Curling Legs), with Kringkastingsorkesteret at Kongsberg Jazz Festival

With Urban Connection
2001: Urban Connection (Bergland Productions)
2002: French Only (Bergland Productions)
2004: UC 3 (Bergland Productions)

With Motif
2004: Motif (AIM Record)
2005: Expansion (AIM Record)
2007: Hello..my name is (Vidzone)
2008: Apo Calypso (Jazzland Records)
2010: Facienda (Jazzland Records)
2011: Art Transplant (Clean Feed), with Axel Dörner
2016: My Head Is Listening (Clean Feed Records)

With Svein Olav Herstad Trio
2004: Suite For Simmons (Jazzaway Records), featuring Sonny Simmons
2007: Inventio (Jazzaway Records)

With Excess Luggage (Trio including with Steinar Nickelsen and Vigleik Storaas)
2007: Excess Luggage (Park Grammofon)
2011: Hand Luggage Only (Parallell)

With Maryland (Quartet including with Maria Kannegaard, Håkon Kornstad and Ole Morten Vågan)
2008: Maryland (Moserobie Music)
2009: Maryland Live! (Moserobie Music), recorded at Vossajazz 2008

With Solid (Trio including with Bjørn Vidar Solli and Daniel Buner Formo)
2008: Happy Accidents (AIM Records)
2011: Visitor (Parallell Records), with Seamus Blake

With Håvard Stubø Quartet
2009: Way Up (Way Down) (Bolage)
2011: Spring Roll Insomnia (Bolage)
2014: Vilhelmina (Bolage)

With IPA (Quartet including with Atle Nymo, Ingebrigt Håker Flaten and Magnus Broo)
2009: Lorena (Bolage)
2011: It's A Delicate Thing (Bolage)
2013: Bubble (Moserobie Music)

With Hegge
2017: Vi är ledsna men du får inte längre vara barn (Particular Recordings Collective)

With others
1999: Horace Hello (Gemini Records), with Oddbjørn Blindheim Trio
2007: The Arcades project (Jazzland Recordings), within Håvard Wiik Trio
2008: The Jimmy Carl Black story (Hot Club Records), with Jon Larsen
2008: Complete Communion (Bolage), in trio with Atle Nymo and Ingebrigt Håker Flaten
2008: Wes! (Bolage), within Wes Trio including with Håvard Stubø and Daniel Frank
2011: How High is the Sky (Bolage), within Kjersti Stubø Band
2011: Examination of What (Losen Records), within Håvard Fossum/Børge-Are Halvorsen Quartet, including Håvard Fossum (saxophone), Børge Are Halvorsen (saxophone) & Jens Fossum (double bass)
2013: Live in Tokyo (Reckless Records), within Steinar Raknes Quartet recorded 2011

References

External links 

Håkon Mjåset Johansen Biography – Norsk Musikkinformasjon MIC.no (in Norwegian)
Håvard Stubø Quartet – Kivran! on YouTube

1975 births
Living people
Musicians from Trondheim
20th-century Norwegian drummers
21st-century Norwegian drummers
Norwegian jazz drummers
Male drummers
Norwegian jazz composers
Male jazz composers
Spellemannprisen winners
Norwegian University of Science and Technology alumni
20th-century drummers
20th-century Norwegian male musicians
21st-century Norwegian male musicians
Ensemble Denada members
Trondheim Jazz Orchestra members
Ola Kvernberg Trio members
Come Shine members
Motif (band) members
Urban Connection members